DynamicOps was an American private software company headquartered in Burlington, Massachusetts which developed cloud automation and management solutions. It was acquired by VMware in 2012.

History 

DynamicOps' establishment is connected to Credit Suisse. Its original virtualization software was initially developed inside Credit Suisse’s Global Research and Development Group in 2005. In 2007, after having deployed and used the software to manage its virtual machines, Credit Suisse Ventures decided to fund a separate company to further develop and market the product. DynamicOps was incorporated on January 31, 2008, and publicly launched later that spring. Leslie Muller, who led the development effort at Credit Suisse, became the co-founder and CTO of DynamicOps. The company had raised a total of $27M in venture funding from Credit Suisse, Intel Capital, Sierra Ventures, and Next World Capital. Additionally, DynamicOps had a multi-year licensing and distribution agreement with Dell, in which DynamicOps software was a component of Virtual Integrated System solution. 

In July 2012, DynamicOps was acquired by VMware for a price ranging from $100 to $150 million.

See also
 Amazon EC2
 Cloud computing

References

External links
 Official website

Financial services companies established in 2008
Cloud computing providers
Credit Suisse
Software companies based in Massachusetts
Virtualization
Venture capital firms of the United States
Defunct financial services companies of the United States
Defunct companies based in Massachusetts
2008 establishments in Massachusetts
Software companies established in 2008
Financial services companies disestablished in 2012
Software companies disestablished in 2012
2012 mergers and acquisitions